The Governor of the Turks and Caicos Islands is the representative of the British monarch in the United Kingdom's British Overseas Territory of Turks and Caicos Islands. The Governor is appointed by the monarch on the advice of the British government. The role of the Governor is to act as the vice-regal representative of the head of state, His Majesty King Charles III. The Governor appoints the Premier and 5 members of the House of Assembly. The official residence of the Governor is the Government House of Turks and Caicos Islands, located in Waterloo on the island of Grand Turk.

In August 2009, the United Kingdom suspended the islands' self-government after allegations of ministerial corruption. The prerogative of the ministerial government and the House of Assembly were vested in the Governor until self-government was restored in 2012.

The Governor has his own flag in the Turks and Caicos Islands, the Union Flag with the territory's coat of arms superimposed.

Nigel Dakin is the current Governor of the Turks and Caicos Islands. On 15 December 2022, the Foreign, Commonwealth, & Development Office announced that the current Governor of the British Overseas Territory of Anguilla, Dileeni Daniel-Selvaratnam, would be succeeding Nigel Dakin as Governor in June 2023.

History

The islands were a dependency of Jamaica until that colony received independence in 1962. Afterwards the governor of the Bahamas oversaw affairs from 1965 to 1973. With Bahamian independence, the islands received a separate governor in 1973.

Governors of The Turks and Caicos Islands

References

External links
Office of the Governor
Turks and Caicos Islands

 
Turks
Lists of political office-holders in the Turks and Caicos Islands